Knocknahillion is one of the Maumturk Mountains of Connemara in County Galway, Ireland. At , it is the 210th–highest peak in Ireland on the Arderin list, and 256th–highest on the Vandeleur-Lynam list.  Knocknahillion is in the middle sector of the long north-west to south-east spine of the Maumturks.  The summit is offset to the west of the rocky central ridge of the Maumturks, and its western-facing slopes have a distinctive "diagonal" rock stratification when viewed from the Inagh Valley.

Naming
Irish academic Paul Tempan notes that Knocknahillion derives its name from the townlands of Illion and Illion West. It is to the west of the central spine of the Maumturks range at a point where the range turns to a more south-easterly direction (like an elbow).

Geography
Knocknahillion is in the middle sector of the long north-west to south-east central spine of the Maumturks range in Connemara.

Hill walking
The easiest way summit Knocknahillion is a 5-kilometre 2-3-hour route via the pass of  Maumahoge; however, because of its positioning on the high rocky central spine of the central Maumturk range, it is also summited in a longer 14-kilometre 5-6 hour loop-route starting at the col of Maumahoge in the south, climbing Knocknahillion and then along a winding 2-kilometre rocky ridge to the top of Letterbreckaun, before descending via the sharp "v-shaped" col of Maam Turk (meaning "pass of the boar"), from which the entire range bears its name.

Knocknahillion is also climbed as part of the Maamturks Challenge, a 25-kilometre 10–12 hour walk over the full Maumturks range (from Maam Cross to Leenaun), which is considered one of the "great classic ridge-walks of Ireland", but of "extreme grade" due to the circa 7,600 feet of total ascent; however, because the peak of Knocknahillon is offset to the west of the core winding rocky ridge, it is not always summited during the challenge.

Rock climbing
While the Maumturks range is not particularly known for rock climbing routes (unlike Bencorr and its Carrot Ridge spur, across the Inagh Valley), some have been developed at a crag just below and west of Lough Maumahoge (L876 532), with routes of 90 to 190 metres at climbing grades of S to HVS.

Gallery

Bibliography

See also

Twelve Bens, major range in Connemara
Mweelrea, major range in Killary Harbour
Lists of mountains in Ireland
Lists of mountains and hills in the British Isles
List of Marilyns in the British Isles
List of Hewitt mountains in England, Wales and Ireland

References

External links
The Maamturks Challenge, University College Galway Mountaineering Club
The Maamturks Challenge: Routecard (2015)
MountainViews: The Irish Mountain Website, Knocknahillion 
MountainViews: Irish Online Mountain Database
The Database of British and Irish Hills , the largest database of British Isles mountains ("DoBIH")
Hill Bagging UK & Ireland, the searchable interface for the DoBIH

Marilyns of Ireland
Hewitts of Ireland
Mountains and hills of County Galway
Mountains under 1000 metres